T.R.U. REALigion is the seventh mixtape by American rapper 2 Chainz. It was released on November 1, 2011. The song "Riot" peaked at number 15 on the Bubbling Under Hot 100 and number 54 on the Hot R&B/Hip-Hop Songs charts and was later included on his debut album Based on a T.R.U. Story (2012).

The project has amassed over 1 million downloads on mixtape sharing site DatPiff, making it certified Diamond as per the website's standards. This tape features guest appearances from Cap.1, Meek Mill, T.I., Kreayshawn, Young Jeezy, Yo Gotti, Birdman, J-Hard, Big Sean, Jadakiss, Dolla Boy, Raekwon, and Trey Songz.

On November 8, 2021, was released the 10th Anniversary Edition of T.R.U Realigion on the streaming services, with two new songs. He has also announced a one-week tour with DJ Drama.

Reception

Critical response 

T.R.U. REALigion was met with generally favorable reviews from music critics. Martin Spasov of XXL gave the album an XL, saying "Even though T.R.U. REALigion, isn’t a groundbreaking or particularly wholly creative mixtape (some of the long-haired rapper’s rhymes are actually simple but quite funny), when the subject is stuntin’ or ballin’ (or griming), 2 Chainz excels, and creates satisfying trunk-rattling music. That is when both the tape and the rapper are at their best: when the only goal is to get you to zone out and nod your head to the almost primal drums. That’s when the music, like 2 Chainz’ rise to fame, is volcanic."

Track listing

References

2011 mixtape albums
2 Chainz albums
DJ Drama albums
Albums produced by Lex Luger
Albums produced by Drumma Boy
Albums produced by Fatboi
Albums produced by Mike Will Made It
Albums produced by Southside (record producer)